The Wadhurst Clay Formation is a geological unit which forms part of the Wealden Group and the middle part of the now unofficial Hastings Beds. These geological units make up the core of the geology of the High Weald in the English counties of West Sussex, East Sussex and Kent.

The other component formations of the Hastings Beds are the underlying Ashdown Formation and the overlying Tunbridge Wells Sand Formation. The Hastings Beds in turn form part of the Wealden Group which underlies much of southeast England. The sediments of the Weald, including the Wadhurst Clay Formation, were deposited during the Early Cretaceous Period, which lasted for approximately 40 million years from 140 to 100 million years ago. The Wadhurst Clay is of Early to Late Valanginian age. The Formation takes its name from the market town of Wadhurst in East Sussex.

Lithology 

The Wadhurst Clay comprises predominantly medium to dark bluish grey over-consolidated clays, silts, mudstones, and shales. These lithologies often occur with subordinate amounts of pale grey silty mudstones, laminated siltstones, sandstones, conglomerate, shelly limestones and clay-ironstones. When they become exposed to the elements at the surface, the mudstones often degrade over a short period of time and weather to yellowish brown and greenish grey clays.

The formation thickness ranges from 55m in the Tenterden area, to 30m near Lewes and varies in between. In Kent, the Wadhurst Clay has been proven to over 70m thick near Tunbridge Wells and in West Sussex up to 80m near Horsham.

The base of the Wadhurst Clay is taken at the bottom of the Top Ashdown Pebble Bed. The base of this marker horizon marks the formational change to the Ashdown Formation. Despite its name this thin and impressistent bed comprises a coarse grained to gravelly sandstone. This horizon is best exposed at Cliff End, East Sussex, but where it is encountered elsewhere, it is usually fairly distinctive and easily identified. The Top Ashdown Pebble Bed occurs mainly in the southern half of East Sussex and is often missing elsewhere. Where this is the case, the boundary is taken at a layer of disconnected ripples.

The top of the Wadhurst Clay is marked by a distinct lithological change into the siltstones of the Tunbridge Wells Sand Formation. The uppermost clays of the Wadhurst Clay, closest to the boundary are often stained red.

Engineering Geology 

Natural slopes in the Wadhurst Clay, like those in the Ashdown Formation, are known for their instability, especially where impermeable clays and impermeable silts and siltstones are interbedded. Instability, resulting in landslips, often occurs along shear surfaces and weaknesses that originally developed during the Late Devensian glaciation. Other common features include cambering, valley bulging and solifluction lobes.

Landslips often occur at or close to the upper boundary of the Wadhurst Clay, which is shared with the overlying Tunbridge Wells Sand Formation. This is partly caused by the steep sided hill, valley and ravine topography of the High Weald and partly by the lithological variation between the formations and the presence of spring lines and seepages.

When percolating groundwater in the permeable sandstones of the Tunbridge Wells Sands comes into contact with the upper impermeable clay beds of the Wadhurst Clay, it is forced to find alternative migration pathways to the surface. This results in the saturation and weakening of the upper portion of the Wadhurst Clay, increasing the chances of failure.

Paleobiota
Taken from

Fish

Dinosaurs

Amphibians

Crocodyliformes

Mammals

Plesiosaurians

See also 
 Hastings Group
 Ashdown Formation
 Tunbridge Wells Sand Formation
 Geology of East Sussex

References

External links 
British Geological Survey lexicon

Lithostratigraphy of England
Claystone
Lower Cretaceous Series of Europe
Valanginian Stage